Taha Abdel Kader, also known as Khaled Aref, (also known by his kunya Abu Adham  —"Adham's Father"; Born in 1946 in Kaukab Abu al-Hija village – ) was a Palestinian politician, diplomat and member of the nationalist party Fatah.

On October 6, 2010, he was appointed Ambassador of the State of Palestine to Bahrain by Palestinian President Mahmoud Abbas. On April 12, 2011, he presented his credentials to the King of Bahrain, Hamad bin Isa Al Khalifa.  On September 11, 2020, the Palestinian Ministry of Foreign Affairs and Expatriates decided to withdraw him from Bahrain as a result of Bahrain–Israel normalization agreement. On 18 Nov 2020, he returned to Bahrain.

See also 

 Palestine-Bahrain relations
 Embassy of the State of Palestine in Bahrain

References 

Palestinian politicians
Palestinian refugees
1946 births
Ambassadors of the State of Palestine to Bahrain
Living people